Léo Souris (18 July 1911 — 14 March 1990) was a Belgian composer, arranger, planner and conductor. He was mostly known for conducting Belgium in the Eurovision Song Contest Eurovision Song Contest 1956.

In 1928, at the age of 17, he was founded and led his own orchestra.

Singles & EP's

Playing career 
Before conducting, he played for two orchestras. In 1952, he played "Paul Norman And His Orchestra - Rocking Horse Rag / Hésitation.

He then performed "Jean Woodman With Léo Souris' Swingettes - Shoo Shoo Baby / I'll Be Seeing You".

Conducting career 
For his previous performance which was "Jean Woodman With Léo Souris' Swingettes - Shoo Shoo Baby / I'll Be Seeing You", he was playing, but then was the conductor, the years following.

References

External links
 Léo Souris at Discogs
 Léo Souris at IMDb

1911 births
1990 deaths
Eurovision Song Contest conductors
Belgian composers
Male composers
Belgian conductors (music)
Male conductors (music)
20th-century conductors (music)
20th-century Belgian male musicians